Denise Francine Boyd Andrews (October 15, 1956 – May 3, 2022) was an American drug counsellor and actress.

Early life 
Boyd was born on October 15, 1956, in Baltimore, Maryland.

Career 
Her story was chronicled in The Corner: a Year in the Life of an Inner-city Neighbourhood, a book by David Simon and Ed Burns, which was adapted into an HBO miniseries. Her son, DeAndre McCullough, died at the age of 35. Boyd was an actress, known for The Wire (2002) and The Corner (2000).

Death 
She died on May 3, 2022, at her home in Parkville, Maryland. She married Donnie Andrews in 2007.

Award and accolades 

 Golden Globe Awards 1986

References 

1956 births
2022 deaths
21st-century American actresses
Actresses from Baltimore